Puducherry, also known as Pondicherry or Pondichéry, is a union territory of India, consisting of four small geographically unconnected districts. It was formed out of four territories of former French India, namely  Pondichéry  (Pondicherry; now Puducherry),  Karikal  (Karaikal),  Mahé  and  Yanaon (now Yanam), excluding Chandannagar (Chandernagore), and it is named after the largest district, Puducherry, which was also the capital of French India. Historically known as Pondicherry, the territory changed its official name to Puducherry on 20 September 2006.

The Union Territory of Puducherry lies in the southern part of the Indian Peninsula. The areas of Puducherry district and Karaikal district are bound by the state of Tamil Nadu, while Yanam district and Mahé district are enclosed by the states of Andhra Pradesh and Kerala, respectively. Puducherry is the 29th most populous of the 36 states and union territories of India, and the third most densely populated union territory.

History 

The earliest recorded history of the municipality of Puducherry can be traced to the second century CE. The Periplus of the Erythraean Sea mentions a marketplace named Poduke (ch 60). G. W. B. Huntingford suggested this might be a site about 2 miles from the modern Puducherry, which was possibly the location of Arikamedu (now part of Ariyankuppam). Huntingford noted that Roman pottery was found at Arikamedu in 1937. In addition, archaeological excavations between 1944 and 1949 showed that it was "a trading station to which goods of Roman manufacture were imported during the first half of the 1st century" Subsequent investigation by Vimala Begley from 1989 to 1992 modified this assessment, and now place the period of occupation from the third or second century BCE to the eighth century CE.

In 1674, the municipality of Pondicherry (Pondichéry) became a French colony in the French colonial empire. Together with Chandernagor (already French since 1673), Mahé (since 1721), Yanam (Yanaon) (since 1723), Karaikal (Karikal) (since 1739) and Masulipatam (1760), it formed the colony of French India, under a single French governor in Pondicherry, although French rule over one or more of these enclaves was repeatedly interrupted by British occupations. The territories of French India were completely transferred to the Republic of India de facto on 1 November 1954, and de jure on 16 August 1962, when French India ceased to exist, becoming the present Indian union territory of Pondicherry, combining four coastal enclaves. The fifth, Chandannagar, merged with the state of West Bengal in 1954. Immediately after the de facto transfer, the area was renamed the State of Pondicherry by the “French Establishments (Change of Name) Order, 1954” issued by the Ministry of External Affairs of India. The State of Pondicherry continued to be under the direct control of Government of India under the aegis of the Ministry of External affairs until 31 August 1964. Meanwhile, with effect from 1 July 1963, the State of Pondicherry officially became the Union Territory of Pondicherry and after 31 August 1964 it came under the control of the Ministry of Home Affairs.

Until 2016, the de jure transfer day (i.e. 16th of August) was a public holiday with no official celebrations taking place. In 2016, Lt. Governor of Puducherry, Kiran Bedi, made it a holiday as “De Jure Transfer Day.”

Since 2010, de facto transfer day (i.e. 1st of November) has been celebrated as Liberation day throughout Puducherry. In 2014, Liberation day was declared as a public Holiday. This initiative was taken shortly after the NDA government came to power in 2014 and newly appointed Lt. Governor A. K. Singh issued a notification regarding that decision of the central government.

Geography

Puducherry and Karaikal have the largest areas and population, and are both enclaves of Tamil Nadu. Yanam and Mahé are enclaves of Andhra Pradesh and Kerala, respectively. Its population, as per the 2011 Census, is 1,394,467. Puducherry is the smallest union territory in terms of sea coastline with 30.6 km length.

Some of Puducherry's regions are themselves amalgamations of non-contiguous enclaves, often called "pockets" in India. The Puducherry region is made of 11 such pockets, some of which are very small and entirely surrounded by the territory of Tamil Nadu. Mahé region is made up of three pockets. This unusual geography is a legacy of the colonial period with Puducherry retaining the borders of former French India.

All four regions of Puducherry are located in the coastal region. Five rivers in Puducherry district, seven in Karaikal district, two in Mahé district and one in Yanam district drain into the sea, but none originates within the territory.

Districts of Union Territory of Puducherry

 Puducherry district is an enclave of Tamil Nadu.
 Karaikal district is an enclave of Tamil Nadu.
 Mahé district is an enclave of Kerala.
 Yanam district is an enclave of Andhra Pradesh.

Demographics

Hinduism is the major religion, adhered to by 87.3% of the population. Other religions practiced in the territory include Christianity (6.29%) and Islam (6.05%).

Government and administration 

Puducherry is a union territory of India rather than a state, which implies that governance and administration fall directly under federal authority. However, Puducherry is one of the three union territories in India (the others being National Capital Territory of Delhi and Jammu and Kashmir) that is entitled by a special constitutional amendment to have an elected legislative assembly and a cabinet of ministers, thereby conveying partial statehood. There has been some interest by the territory's government in receiving full statehood, but budgetary issues remain a consideration. Also, Mahe and Yanam may oppose such a change of status.

The central government is represented by the Lieutenant Governor, who resides at the Raj Nivas (Le Palais du Gouverneur) at the Park, the former palace of the French governor. The central government is more directly involved in the territory's financial well-being unlike states, which have a central grant that they administer. Consequently, Puducherry has at various times, enjoyed lower taxes, especially in the indirect category.

Special administration status 

According to the Treaty of Cession of 1956, the four territories of former French India territorial administration are permitted to make laws with respect to specific matters. In many cases, such legislation may require ratification from the federal government or the assent of the President of India.

Article II of the Treaty states:
 (The Establishments will keep the benefit of the special administrative status which was in force prior to 1 November 1954. Any constitutional changes in this status which may be made subsequently shall be made after ascertaining the wishes of the people).

Languages 

The most widely spoken first language is Tamil, which is native to % of the population. There are also speakers of Telugu (%), Malayalam (%) and Urdu (%). The official languages of Puducherry are French, Tamil, Telugu (in Yanam), Malayalam (in Mahe) and English. An official mention in Rajya Sabha Parliamentary debates during 2006 confirms that Puducherry have all these five languages as official.

Continuation of French 

Article XXVIII of the Treaty states:
 (The French language shall remain the official language of the Establishments so long as the elected representatives of the people shall not decide otherwise).

The 1963 Pondicherry representative assembly resolution also voted for continuance of French as official language and addition of other languages spoken in Puducherry such as Tamil, Telugu and Malayalam along with English and Hindi.

Inclusion of other languages 
Considering the 1956 Treaty of cession and 1963 Assembly resolution, the 1963 Union Territories Act reconfirmed the 1963 resolution that French shall continue to be used as an official language unless the legislative assembly does not decide otherwise. The 1963 act allowed provision for inclusion of more official languages. Two years later, new official languages were recognised by The Pondicherry Official Language Act, 1965  which makes no mention of French (but also not officially denying it) implying the implicit continuation of its official language status. The same act stated that the Tamil language shall be the language to be used for all or any of the official purposes of the Union territory and the same official recognition is given for English. The same act also recognized officially Malayalam and Telugu in the Mahé and Yanam districts respectively.

The widespread anti-Hindi agitations in the mid-1960s in South India would have prompted for inclusion of all the languages suggested in the 1963 assembly resolution except Hindi in the list of official languages of Puducherry. While the Union Territory official gazette's name is in French, it is published exclusively in English.

Judiciary 
The jurisdiction of the Madras High Court  has been extended to Pondicherry with effect from 6 November 1962.
The Chief Justice of the Madras High Court is the head of the judiciary of Puducherry. The present chief justice is Munishwar Nath Bhandari.

Economy 

The gross domestic product of Puducherry, at market prices estimated by Ministry of Statistics and Programme Implementation with figures in millions of Indian rupees grew from 1,840 to 258,190 million rupees from 1980 to 2014.

Fisheries
The potential for fisheries is substantial in the Union Territory. Tanks and ponds are also tapped for commercial fish rearing.

Tourism

Puducherry is one of the most popular tourist spots in India for national and international tourists. Puducherry was the residence of Sri Aurobindo (1872–1950) and the Sri Aurobindo Ashram still operates from Puducherry. A unique experimental city Auroville, the brainchild of the Mother, whose inhabitants are drawn from all parts of the world is situated on the outskirts of the city. There are several temples, churches, monuments, parks, and mosques which attract tourists.

Transportation

Rail 

Puducherry is connected by a railway branch line from the five-way junction at Viluppuram and Chennai. The railway line is a broad gauge line with 16 originating trains and 17 terminating trains.

Meanwhile Karaikal and Mahe also well connected by railway lines. Several railway lines are also under construction in Karaikal district. The nearest major railway station to Yanam is Kakinada (CCT) in Andhra Pradesh (33 KM).

Air 
Puducherry has an airport called Puducherry Airport. It has flight operations between Puducherry and Hyderabad. A new airport is proposed in Karaikal which is called as Karaikal Airport. The nearest airport to Yanam is Rajahmundry Airport (IATA: RJA, ICAO: VORY), 90 KM away.

Sea 
Puducherry U.T. has several ports namely Karaikal port, Puducherry port, Mahe port. Among them, Largest port is Karaikal Port.

Road 

Puducherry has a network all-weather metalled roads connecting the territory. Puducherry has a road length of 2,552 km (road length per 4.87 km2), the highest in the country. PRTC buses play a vital role in Puducherry U.T.

Education 

According to the 2011 census, Puducherry had a literacy rate of 86.55. Pondicherry University is a university centrally located in Puducherry. Other educational institutions include Jawaharlal Institute of Postgraduate Medical Education & Research (JIPMER), Indira Gandhi Medical College and Research Institute (Govt. of Puducherry), Mahathma Gandhi Post Graduate Institute of Dental Science (Govt. of Puducherry), Tagore Arts and Science College, Indira Gandhi College of Arts and Science (Govt. of Puducherry), Mahatma Gandhi Medical College and Research Institute, National Institute of Technology, Puducherry, Perunthalaivar Kamarajar Institute of Engineering and Technology, Pondicherry Engineering College, Mother Theresa Post Graduate and Research Institute of Health Sciences, Achariya College of Engineering Technology (ACET), Rajiv Gandhi College of Engineering and Technology, Rajiv Gandhi College of Veterinary and Animal Sciences, Mahatma Gandhi Medical College & Research Institute, Sri Manakula Vinayagar Medical College Hospital, Sri Ganesh College of Engineering and Technology, and Sri Venkateshwaraa Medical College Hospital and Research Centre.

In popular culture 

 Puducherry was the setting for Yann Martel's first third of his Booker Prize-winning novel Life of Pi (2001). A portion of the subsequent film adaptation was filmed there.
 Lee Langley's novel A House in Pondicherry (1996) was set there.
 Prince Pondicherry is an Indian character from Roald Dahl's children's novel Charlie and the Chocolate Factory (1964). The prince orders Willy Wonka to build a palace of chocolate in India; the palace melts in the hot sun.

See also 

 Puducherry (Lok Sabha constituency)
 Puducherry Legislative Assembly
 Chandannagar
 French East India Company
 French colonial empire
 Municipal Administration in French India

References

External links 

 Official website of the Government of the Union Territory of Puducherry
 Treaty establishing De Jure Cession of French Establishments in India
 Official website of Department of Tourism, Pondicherry
 Official website of Pondicherry Media, Pondicherry
 

 
.
Union territories of India
English-speaking countries and territories
French-speaking countries and territories
Tamil-speaking countries and territories
States and territories established in 1963
1963 establishments in India
States and union territories of India
Enclaves and exclaves